Esclaramunda of Foix (1250–1315) was Queen consort of Majorca from 1276-1311.

Life
She was the daughter of Roger IV of Foix and Brunissenda of Cardona, daughter of Ramon VIII, Viscount of Cardona. Named after her great-grandmother, Esclaramunda was twenty years old when she married James II of Majorca.

She was responsible for tutoring her grandson James III of Majorca. She was protector of the Order of Mercy. Her feast is on 22 October.

Marriage and issue
In 1275, Esclaramunda married James II of Majorca, with whom she had six children:
 James, who became a Franciscan friar before his father's death.
 Sancho, James II's successor
 Sancha of Majorca, who married Robert of Naples.
 Ferdinand, father of James III
 Philip, regent of Majorca during James III's minority
 Elizabeth, wife of Juan Manuel, Prince of Villena.

She survived her husband by only five years, and died in Perpignan.

References

Majorcan queens consort
1250 births
1315 deaths
House of Foix